Rigel is a blue supergiant star in the Orion constellation, also known as Beta Orionis.

Rigel may also refer to:
 Rigel (comics), a character in a series published by Panini Comics
 Rigel (dog), a Newfoundland dog said to have helped rescue survivors from the sinking of the Titanic
 Rigel (microprocessor), a VAX microprocessor chip set developed and fabricated by Digital Equipment Corporation
 Rigel (rocket), an Argentinian sounding rocket
 MS Rigel, a Norwegian and German vessel
 USS Rigel (AD-13), a ship built in 1918 as Edgecombe
 USS Rigel (AF-58), a ship laid down in 1954
 SSM-N-6 Rigel, a proposed cruise missile system
 Rigel, a composition for trumpet and piano by Hale A. VanderCook
 Rigel, a genus of megalyrid wasps from Chile
 Rigel, a fictional nation in Fire Emblem Gaiden and Fire Emblem Echoes: Shadows of Valentia

People with the surname
 Henri-Joseph Rigel, a German-born French composer

See also
 Rygel, the Farscape character
 Riegel (disambiguation), several meanings
 Rigil Kentaurus, a Sun-like star in the Centaurus constellation also known as Alpha Centauri A, distance only about 4.37 light-years
 USS Rigel, a list of US Navy ships